Statistics of Ekstraklasa for the 1936 season.

Overview
The championship was contested by 10 teams, and Ruch Hajduki Wielkie (currently Ruch Chorzów) won the title.

Season's Legia Warsaw relegation from Ekstraklasa, was its only decline from the first tier of the Polish football league system in its more than 100-year history.

League table

Results

References

Poland - List of final tables (RSSSF)

Ekstraklasa seasons
1
Pol
Pol